Fantasma is the third studio album by Japanese musician Cornelius, released on August 6, 1997, on his label Trattoria. Cornelius envisioned the album as "a one-on-one experience between the music and the listener. ... It starts with you entering into the journey and ends with you returning to reality." It peaked at number six on the Oricon Albums Chart and number 37 on the UK Independent Albums Chart. Three singles were issued from the album: "Star Fruits Surf Rider", "Free Fall", and "Chapter 8 – Seashore and Horizon –".

Fantasma was initially received with mixed reviews, but drew more praise in later years as one of the defining works of Shibuya-kei. Critic W. David Marx described Fantasma as "an important textbook for an alternative musical history where Bach, Bacharach, and the Beach Boys stands as the great triumvirate."

The Japanese edition of Rolling Stone ranked Fantasma number 10 on its list of the "100 Greatest Japanese Rock Albums of All Time".

Production
The tracks on Fantasma were written and recorded in the same order they appear on the album, and were produced on magnetic digital reel tape recorders. Cornelius's goal in creating Fantasma was "to take the listener on a personal trip"; he envisioned the album as "a one-on-one experience between the music and the listener. ... It starts with you entering into the journey and ends with you returning to reality." Almost all of the tracks were named after existing bands, including Count Five, the Clash, and Microdisney. Buffalo Daughter's Moog Yamamoto appeared on "Mic Check" and "2010". The Apples in Stereo's Robert Schneider and Hilarie Sidney co-wrote and performed on "Chapter 8 – Seashore and Horizon –", while the High Llamas' Sean O'Hagan (formerly of Microdisney) appeared on "Thank You for the Music".

Fantasma contains numerous homages to Brian Wilson and the Beach Boys' 1966 release Pet Sounds. The album had recently seen a resurgence of interest among musicians and critics, and during the making of Fantasma, Oyamada had read a biography about Wilson. The opening of "Mic Check" (which is a preview of the closing track) musically resembles the Beach Boys' hymn "Our Prayer", while "God Only Knows" was named after their song of the same title. The liner notes of Fantasma also include photos of Oyamada recreating two iconic photographs of Wilson from the Pet Sounds era, with Oyamada posing and dressing as Wilson did in the original photos. Historian Michael Roberts writes, "As the image makes clear, it's the figure of Wilson as producer, as much as musician, that haunts Fantasma and its central trope of the recording studio."

Release
In Japan, the limited edition of Fantasma, which was packaged with stereo earphones, was released via Cornelius's own label Trattoria Records on August 6, 1997. The standard edition of the album was released on September 3, 1997. Fantasma peaked at number six on the Oricon Albums Chart. On March 24, 1998, Fantasma was released in North America and Europe via Matador Records. Due to sample clearance issues, "Monkey" was retitled "Magoo Opening", the same title as the sampled song, and relisted as a cover version. Fantasma peaked at number 37 on the UK Independent Albums Chart.  As of 2006, the album had sold more than 300,000 copies worldwide.

Two companion remix albums, FM and CM, were released on November 26, 1998. The former is composed of remixes of Fantasma tracks by Money Mark, the High Llamas, Buffalo Daughter, the Pastels, Damon Albarn of Blur, Unkle, and Coldcut. The latter is composed of remixes by Cornelius of tracks by most of the artists that contributed to FM. FM reached number 39 and CM reached number 40 on the Oricon Albums Chart.

Critical reception

Stephen Thomas Erlewine of AllMusic praised Fantasma as "one of those rare records where you can't tell what's going to happen next, and it leaves you hungry for more." Stephen Thompson of The A.V. Club said, "Fantasma is a crisp, dynamic, mostly pleasant construction that sounds like the product of one inventive man whose sounds are created and manipulated strictly within the confines of a studio setting." Steve McClure of Billboard called it "a wonderful example of how some of Japan's best pop musicians assimilate Western musical influences and combine them in original, quirky ways."

In 2007, the Japanese edition of Rolling Stone placed Fantasma at number 10 on its list of the "100 Greatest Japanese Rock Albums of All Time". In 2011, the album was included in LA Weeklys "beginner's guide" to the Shibuya-kei genre. Tokyo Weekender writer Ed Cunningham cited it in 2020 as "a pinnacle" of the genre, and "one of the best-known Shibuya-kei records outside of Japan – if anyone has heard a Shibuya-kei release, it's probably Fantasma." Reviewing the album's 2016 reissue, Patrick St. Michel of Pitchfork said that Fantasma "distills the spirit and process of Shibuya-kei down to its purest essence". Daniel Sylvester of Exclaim! wrote that "Cornelius used entire genre motifs wholesale to deliver one of the most exploratory releases of all time."

Reissue history
On November 3, 2010, a remastered version of Fantasma was released via Warner Music Japan. It was remastered by Yoshinori Sunahara (a former member of Denki Groove). The limited edition includes a bonus CD and a bonus DVD.

On June 10, 2016, Fantasma was reissued in the United States, coinciding with a tour in August, including a date performing at the Eaux Claires festival. The album was released as a limited edition remastered double vinyl LP via Lefse Records and digitally released via Post Modern.

Track listing

In this hidden track, Eye of Boredoms introduces songs by three acts on his label Shock City (all of which either include him or are pseudonyms), which then play, with each one segueing into the next.  In order, they are "Super Nature" by Sound Hero, "Best Brain" by Free Brain, and "Rock Fantastictac" by DJ Question; all of them only appear on this release.  The preceding title track on this edition has seven minutes of silence added to the end, for a total length of 7:56.

Personnel
Credits are adapted from the album's liner notes.

Musicians
 Keigo Oyamada (also credited as "The Ape") – performance, arrangement
 Kazumichi Fujiwara – vocals (on "Mic Check", "Star Fruits Surf Rider" and "2010")
 Yoshié Hiragakura – drums (on "Count Five or Six", "Star Fruits Surf Rider" and "Free Fall")
 Kinbara Strings – strings (on "The Micro Disneycal World Tour", "Star Fruits Surf Rider" and "God Only Knows")
 Toyoaki Mishima – keyboards
 Sean O'Hagan – banjo, sampler, chorus (on "Thank You for the Music")
 Robert Schneider – vocals, bass (on "Chapter 8 – Seashore and Horizon –")
 Hilarie Sidney – vocals, drums (on "Chapter 8 – Seashore and Horizon –")
 Moog Yamamoto – scratching (on "Mic Check" and "2010")
 Yuki Yano – theremin (on "The Micro Disneycal World Tour")

Production
 Keigo Oyamada – production, mixing
 Toyoaki Mishima – hard disk manipulation
 Nakai-kun – assistance
 Toru Takayama – mixing, engineering

Design
 Masakazu Kitayama – artwork
 Yumi Nakamura – styling
 Akemi Nakano – styling
 Hiroshi Nomura – photography
 Mitsuo Shindō – artwork
 Hiroko Umeyama – styling

Charts

References

Bibliography

External links
 
 

1997 albums
Cornelius (musician) albums
Matador Records albums
Japanese-language albums